Kingsley Njoku (born 18 August 1986 in Lagos, Nigeria) is a Nigerian footballer who last played for Lalor United of the Australian Men's State League 4 North.

Career

Singapore

Clinching the 2008 Singapore League Cup trophy with Gombak United of the Singapore S.League, Njoku tried out for Norwegian side Lyn Oslo that year before re-joining Gombak United in March 2009 and netting a goal in a 1-0 win over Young Lions upon returning. However, because of a situation regarding his marriage in Nigeria, which had deleterious effects on his mental health, the striker was dropped from the Gombak United roster in early 2010.

Cambodia

Announced as one of Cambodian outfit Phnom Penh Crown's new signings in late 2010, Njoku donned the number 20 jersey, scoring the winning goal to help Crown list the 2011 Cambodian League title and finishing that season with 10 goals in the league and 4 before the final of the 2011 AFC President's Cup. He then stayed with Phnom Penh Crown for 2012, missing the first half of the season on account of being suspended by the AFC.

In 2011, Njoku scored 5 goals in a friendly game opposing Asia Euro University that ended 10-1 in favor of Crown; that year, he also scored the opening goal 12 seconds into the match, in a 4-0 triumph over Prek Pra Keila.

He is an Igbo, an ethnic group ubiquitous in southern Nigeria.

References

External links 

 Player CV
 at Soccerway

1986 births
Sportspeople from Lagos
Living people
Association football forwards
Expatriate footballers in Cambodia
Singapore Premier League players
Gombak United FC players
Nigerian footballers
Phnom Penh Crown FC players
Nigerian expatriate footballers
Expatriate footballers in Singapore
Expatriate soccer players in Australia
Preston Lions FC players